Tocantins is a state in Brazil.

Tocantins may also refer to:

Places and jurisdictions 
 Tocantins River, a river in Brazil
 Tocantins basin, a drainage basin in Brazil
 Tocantins River (Jamanxim River), a river in Pará, Brazil
 Tocantins, Minas Gerais, a Brazilian municipality
 Territorial Prelature of São José de Alto Tocantins, a former Catholic pre-diocese in Brazil

Sports and entertainment 
 Survivor: Tocantins, a reality show set in Tocantins, Brazil
 Tocantins Esporte Clube, a Brazilian football (soccer) club
 Tocantins Esporte Clube (TO), a Brazilian football (soccer) club
 Tocantins Futebol Clube, a Brazilian football (soccer) club